The Hard Ride is a 1971 action film about a U.S. Marine who promises to take care of a dead friend's motorcycle and is threatened by a rival biker gang in the process. The film was written and directed by Burt Topper and stars Robert Fuller, Sherry Bain, and Tony Russel.

Production
It was known during production as Bury An Angel (1970).

The soundtrack was released on the Paramount Records label (PAS 6005) the same year as the picture was released and features a mix of pop and folk rock songs, including a rendition of "Swing Low, Sweet Chariot" sung by Bill Medley. All songs were arranged or written by Harley Hatcher.

Reception
Reviews were mixed. Some praised the fact that there was more depth to the film than most other biker flicks, while others have found the movie unoriginal and preachy.

See also
 List of American films of 1971
 Easy Rider 
 Hippie exploitation films

References

External links
 
 Turner Classic Movies
 Park Circus

1971 films
1971 action films
American action films
Outlaw biker films
Films directed by Burt Topper
1970s English-language films
1970s American films